The Cái River is a river of Vietnam. It flows through Khánh Hòa Province and Đắk Lắk Province. The river has a basin area of 1904 km².

Rivers of Khánh Hòa province
Rivers of Đắk Lắk province
Rivers of Vietnam